Chioselia Rusă is a commune and village in the Gagauz Autonomous Territorial Unit of the Republic of Moldova.  The 2004 census listed the commune as having a population of 735 people.   Gagauz total 185. Other ethnic groups included 266 Moldovans, 23 Russians, 202 Ukrainians, 51 Bulgarians, 4 Romanians and 2 Roma.

Chioselia Rusă's geographical coordinates are 46° 5' 0" North, 28° 30' 59" East.

References

Communes of Gagauzia